"The Self Banished" is a poem written by Edmund Waller in about 1645. It was set to music by the baroque composer John Blow in 1700.

It is also one of the first songs written by the English composer Edward Elgar.  Composed in 1875, specifically for "soprano or tenor", it was unpublished until recently.

Lyrics

Blow set stanzas 1 and 2. Elgar added a stanza beginning with his own spelling of "Absence".

THE SELF-BANISHED

It is not that I love you less
Than when before your feet I lay:
But to prevent the sad increase
Of hopeless love, I keep away.

In vain! (alas!) for ev'ry thing
Which I have known belong to you,
Your form does to my fancy bring,
And makes my old wounds bleed anew.

Who in the Spring from the new Sun
Already has a fever got,
Too late begins those shafts to shun,
Which Phoebus through his veins has shot.

Too late he would the pain assuage,
And to shadows thick he doth retire;
About with him he bears the rage,
And in his tainted blood the fire.

[ is vain for ev'ry thing
That I have known belong to you,
Your form does to my fancy bring,
And makes my old wounds bleed anew.]*

But vow'd I have, and never must
Your banish'd servant trouble you;
For if I break, you may distrust
The vow I made to love you, too.

Recordings
Elgar: Complete Songs for Voice & Piano Amanda Roocroft (soprano), Reinild Mees (piano)

References

External links

Songs by Edward Elgar
1875 songs
1645 poems